Laguenne-sur-Avalouze is a commune in the Corrèze department in central France. It was established on 1 January 2019 by merger of the former communes of Laguenne (the seat) and Saint-Bonnet-Avalouze.

See also
Communes of the Corrèze department

References

Communes of Corrèze